Anthony Inglis may refer to:
 Anthony Inglis (conductor), (1952-) British conductor
 Anthony Inglis (shipbuilder) (1813-1884), engineer and shipbuilder
 Tony Inglis (1914-1999), art director